HuD otherwise known as ELAV-like protein 4 is a protein that in humans is encoded by the ELAVL4 gene.

The HuD/ELAVL4 protein is an RNA-binding protein. HuD contains three RRM protein domains, enabling RNA binding.

HuD is expressed only in neurons and it binds to AU-rich element-containing mRNAs. As a result of this interaction the half-life of the transcript is increased. HuD is important in neurons during brain development and plasticity.

Interactions
HuD (protein) has been shown to interact with NXF1.

References

Further reading